Hemerophila albertiana is a moth in the family Choreutidae. It was described by Pieter Cramer in 1781. It is found in Venezuela, Brazil, Peru and Guyana.

References

Choreutidae
Moths described in 1781